Mahfouz Saber is an Egyptian politician and judge. He served as Minister of Justice in the Second and Third Mahlab Cabinet. He was in office from 17 June 2014 until he resigned on 11 May 2015.

Biography
Saber was Secretary-General of the High Election Committee for the Parliamentary elections of 2011–12. He also served as assistant minister of justice for judicial inspection.

Before his appointment as Minister of Justice in the Second Mahlab Cabinet on 17 June 2014 Saber was head of the disciplinary department at Cairo Appeal Court.

He resigned on 11 May 2015 after stating that judges needed to come from "a respectable milieu" and that the son of a trash collector "would get depressed and would not continue" as a judge. His remarks obtained criticism for being elitist. Prime Minister Ibrahim Mahlab stated that Saber had resigned out of respect for the public opinion.

References

Year of birth missing (living people)
Living people
21st-century Egyptian judges
Justice ministers of Egypt